The selection process for the 1972 Winter Olympics consisted of three bids, and saw Sapporo, Japan, be selected ahead of Banff, Alberta, Canada; Lahti, Finland; and Salt Lake City, Utah, United States. The selection was made at the 64th IOC Session in Rome on 25 April 1966.

Results

References

Further reading
 
 

Bids
 
April 1966 events
1960s in Rome
Events in Rome
1966 in Italy